Dax is a xenomorphic character in the fictional Star Trek universe. The Dax life form  is a symbiont—one that lives inside & bonds to Trill humanoid hosts. The first appearance of a Trill was in the episode "The Host" from the fourth season of Star Trek: The Next Generation; in that early version, the personality of the being was entirely that of Odan, the symbiont within the host, whereas the personalities of the Trills in Star Trek: Deep Space Nine are a blending of the symbiont Dax and its sequential Trill hosts. Two of Dax's hosts, Jadzia Dax and Ezri Dax, appear as major characters in Star Trek: Deep Space Nine. Others are only seen in flashbacks and when taking over others' bodies in the DS9 season 3 episode "Facets". Dax's hosts also appear in spin-offs such as Star Trek: The Human Frontier and The Lives of Dax.

Throughout the franchise's timeline, Dax has been joined with four men and five women, living for more than three hundred years in total. Dax has been present for many important events in Star Trek history, such as the negotiation and signing of the Khitomer Accords (while joined with Curzon), the discovery of the Bajoran wormhole (while joined with Jadzia), and the end of the Dominion War (while joined with Ezri).

Official hosts

Lela Dax
Lela Dax is the first host of the Dax symbiont. Lela appears in the "Facets" Deep Space Nine episode where her consciousness takes over the body of Kira Nerys (Nana Visitor) at Jadzia's zhian'tara ceremony. She is the first Dax incarnation to which Jadzia speaks. Lela is shown as very sociable and easy-going. She comforts Jadzia and dispels her worries as Jadzia was anxious of what she might experience at the ceremony. When talking about herself, Lela says she was one of the first women to be elected to the Trill legislature. She says she took the habit of clasping her hands behind her back to curb excessive hand gesturing while speaking publicly. Jadzia finds she has inherited this behavior.

Tobin Dax
Tobin Dax is an engineer and mathematician in the Trill history and is the second host of the Dax symbiont. In the "Facets" episode, Tobin possesses Miles O'Brien (Colm Meaney). He is shown as extremely timid and shy in social situations. He is very nervous, biting O'Brien's fingernails and continuously making apologies for no real reason. Jadzia tells him she was able to recall his own proof of Fermat's Last Theorem and was fascinated by its original approach.

In the same episode, Curzon Dax tells Jadzia that at his own zhian'tara when his friends and family temporarily embodied past Dax hosts, he gleefully got Tobin's host roaring drunk.

In "The Siege" DS9 season 2 episode, Jadzia uses Tobin's knowledge of sub-impulse thrusters to repair one on an old Bajoran fighter. She describes Tobin as having "barely a sex life and no imagination, but he knew phase coil inverters like no one else".

In the non-canon short story "Dead Man's Hand" (written by Jeffrey Lang and collected into The Lives of Dax), Tobin Dax is involved in the creation of an early transporter and encountered the Vulcan scientist Skon (Spock's grandfather) during an altercation with enemy Romulans.

He is also featured in the novel Star Trek Enterprise : Rise of the Federation - A Choice of Futures as the leader of a team from the Cochrane Institute working on integrating multi-species technology in an emerging Federation.

Emony Dax
Emony Dax is the third host of the Dax symbiont. She is an Olympic gymnast. In the "Facets" episode, she inhabits the body of Leeta (Chase Masterson). Emony thanks Jadzia for finding such a splendid host for her as Leeta's body is well-trained and flexible, able to perform acrobatic tricks. She tells Jadzia that she was afraid her concentration and physical coordination would be impaired due to the join, but it turned out just the opposite.

In the "Trials and Tribble-ations" DS9 season 5 episode, Jadzia recalls that Emony traveled to Earth once to judge a gymnastics competition at the University of Mississippi where she met a young Leonard McCoy. She says Emony had a feeling that Leonard would become a doctor: "He had the hands of a surgeon". The story of their meeting appears in the non-canon short story "Old Souls" (written by Michael Jan Friedman and collected into The Lives of Dax).

Audrid Dax
Audrid Dax is the fourth host of the Dax symbiont. During her lifetime, she rises to become the head of the Trill Symbiosis Commission and gives birth to at least two children, Neema and Gran.

In the "Facets" episode, Audrid borrows the body of Quark (Armin Shimerman). Quark only agrees to the ceremony very reluctantly and Jadzia "forgets to mention" that Quark would be embodying one of Dax's female hosts. Being possessed by Audrid is doubly embarrassing for him as she mainly speaks on womanly subjects such as her feelings of love and motherhood. Audrid says that her election and the birth of her first child were the happiest days of her life.

In the non-canon short story "Sins of the Mother" (written by S.D. Perry and collected into The Lives of Dax), Audrid Dax is part of a joint Trill-Starfleet scientific task force led by Fleet Captain Christopher Pike which investigates a rogue comet which seems to contain Trill life signs. The comet proves to contain a member of an evil parasitic species instead (TNG: "Conspiracy") that seizes control of Audrid's husband, Jayvin Vod. To ensure that the parasite dies, Dax is forced to let her husband die as well which is the cause for her daughter Neema's estrangement from her. The two meet again later in the non-canon novel Unity when Dax is in Ezri and Neema's symbiont Cyl is joined with a Trill enforcement officer Taulin.

Torias Dax
Torias Dax is the first Dax host to join Starfleet, serving as a shuttle test pilot. He is piloting a new Starfleet shuttle when it suffers a catastrophic system failure and crashes, costing Torias his life. After Torias' death, official Trill records indicate that Dax is held in stasis for six months and is then transplanted into Curzon ("Equilibrium" DS9 episode); this is actually a cover-up by the Trill government since Dax's next host is Joran, a psychopath and a murderer.

In the "Facets" episode, Torias’ consciousness takes over the body of Julian Bashir (Alexander Siddig). Torias is depicted as brash, opinionated and a thrill-seeker, who liked to indulge in "the simple pleasures". He also had extensive experience in battle ("The Siege of AR-558").

Torias' widow, Nilani Kahn, later appears in the fourth-season episode "Rejoined" as the same symbiont in a new host: Lenara Kahn. With Dax in a new host too, the two maintain a strained working relationship since Trill societal rules prohibit the re-association of past hosts, the penalty being a permanent exile from the Trill home world. However, their relationship soon becomes romantic. Lenara chooses to call it off, for she is unwilling to accept the punishment.

In the non-canon short story "Infinity" (written by Susan Wright and collected into The Lives of Dax), the shuttle in which Torias Dax dies is testing a prototype version of the transwarp drive (as seen in Star Trek III: The Search for Spock) with the assistance of Lieutenant Saavik and under the command of Captain Styles (both appear in The Search for Spock).

Joran Dax
Joran Dax (born Joran Belar) is a noted musician on the Trill planet and is chosen to host the Dax symbiont after the untimely death of the previous host, Torias. However, at that time it's not known that Joran is a psychopath and a murderer.

Most information about Joran is given in the "Equilibrium" season 3 DS9 episode. There, Jadzia Dax plays a melody Joran has composed and then begins experiencing hidden memories of him as hallucinations and aggressive outbursts. In the visions, a strange music is heard from nowhere, Joran is shown as a serial killer, wearing a mask, eager to kill anyone who his twisted imagination portrays as inappropriate. The visions endanger Jadzia and the symbiont's life so she, Sisko and Bashir travel to the Trill homeworld for treatment. There, Sisko and Bashir find out who Joran was and that all the information on his joining was erased. Jadzia remembers Joran murdering the doctor who recommended to expel him from the symbiosis program. Considering this, Sisko and Bashir deduce that Joran's joining was considered a failure and covered up to hide the fact that an obviously "unsuitable" subject was nevertheless capable of joining (the official party line and the whole idea behind the Commission's existence was that only the few "best of the best" were capable). Jadzia's doctor denies all this and is going to let Jadzia die. Only when Sisko threatens to reveal the truth to the public does she confess. She reveals that in fact about half of the Trill population is capable of joining and the Commission hides this fact fearing that symbionts would be in danger: "It would mean chaos. There aren't nearly enough symbionts for that many hosts. The potential danger to the symbionts would be enormous—they would become commodities to be purchased... prizes to be fought over." She then unseals Dax's memories of Joran to save Jadzia's life.

In the "Field of Fire" season 7 episode, Ezri Dax calls upon her memories of Joran in order to catch a murderer who has killed several people on the Deep Space Nine. Joran strives to entice her to kill someone to "know how it feels" which she is able to resist.

Joran is portrayed by Jeff McBride in the "Equilibrium" episode and Leigh McCloskey in the "Field of Fire" episode. In the "Facets" episode, he possesses Benjamin Sisko (Avery Brooks). Due to the danger of allowing Joran to act freely, Sisko is placed in a holding cell with a force field before Joran is allowed to take over. He has a short and terse conversation with Jadzia, then begins slamming Sisko's head repeatedly into the force field, injuring him. He then tricks Jadzia into turning off the force field and catches her by the throat to "show her how to use his power". Jadzia knocks him down, and Sisko finally reasserts himself.

Curzon Dax
Curzon Dax (played briefly by Frank Owen Smith in the Star Trek: Deep Space Nine episode "Emissary") is a negotiator in the Khitomer Accords whose activities result in the Klingon Empire entering an alliance with the United Federation of Planets. After this, Curzon becomes revered and admired among the Klingon people.

For Jadzia's zhian'tara in the "Facets" episode, Curzon is temporarily embodied into Odo, with a unique result—a blending of Curzon's and Odo's personalities, not unlike the blending of a Trill symbiont with its host. "Curzon Odo" takes advantage of Odo's shapeshifting abilities to transform his face to more closely resemble Curzon's while still retaining recognizable traces of Odo's features. Curzon is shown a very bright personality, extremely charismatic yet arrogant and neglectful at times where he starts behaving selfishly and manipulatively.

Jadzia asks him why he recommended to drop her from the program, yet when she re-applied, advised accepting her, making her the first candidate to ever be re-accepted. Curzon manipulates her, saying he did it out of pity, feeding her fear that he didn't see her as a good enough candidate. Finalizing his blow, he declares he wishes to remain with Odo and not return to Dax. With Sisko's advice, Jadzia manages to bring Curzon down a peg and he finally confesses that he was in fact in love with her. He dropped her to cover his feelings and re-accepted her because he felt guilty. He says that, after all these years, he still loves Jadzia and she convinces him to return to her so that they could be together forever.

In the season 2 episode "Blood Oath", it is revealed that one of Curzon's friends, a Klingon named Kang, named his firstborn Dax and asked Curzon to be the child's godfather. When the young Dax was murdered by an alien known as "The Albino", Curzon joined Kang, Kor and Koloth (whose firstborns have also been murdered by the Albino) in their oath of blood vengeance. The oath is fulfilled by Jadzia and the three Klingons in that episode.

Curzon died of "jah-ma haron" on Risa suffering a heart attack while in the company of a beautiful young woman. Upon his death, the Dax symbiont was transferred into Jadzia. This moment is shown during Jadzia's orb-induced flashback in "Emissary", the first DS9 episode, although Curzon is shown as being conscious during the transferral.

Curzon and Benjamin Sisko were very good friends, with Sisko even often calling Jadzia Dax "old man", the same nickname he used for Dax's previous host. Curzon also frequently played the Ferengi game Tongo.

The novel Forged in Fire depicts the circumstances under which Curzon formed his bond with Kor, Kang and Koloth and their pact to kill the Albino. During their initial confrontation, Captain Hikaru Sulu was also a target of the Albino's vendetta, but he chose not to devote his life to vengeance, aided by the fact that his own child escaped the Albino's revenge as Sulu turned out to have a natural immunity to the toxin the Albino used as a weapon which had been inherited by his daughter.

Jadzia Dax

Jadzia Dax, portrayed by Terry Farrell in the TV series, is a main character in Star Trek: Deep Space Nine seasons 1 to 6.
The station's chief science officer, she marries her fellow DS9 officer Lieutenant Commander Worf but their happiness only lasts a short time when she is fatally injured by a Cardassian, Gul Dukat, who was possessed by a Pah-wraith at the time.

Ezri Dax

Ezri Dax (portrayed by Nicole de Boer) is a major character in Star Trek: Deep Space Nine season 7. After joining, she serves as the station's counselor. She briefly resumes Jadzia's relationship with Worf and later begins a romance with Julian Bashir.

Alternate hosts

Verad Dax
Verad Dax, portrayed by John Glover, steals the Dax symbiont for a few hours in the episode "Invasive Procedures". Verad is a rejected candidate for joining. He makes Bashir remove the Dax symbiont surgically from Jadzia and implant it into him. Dax is later returned to Jadzia before the symbiont and the host integrate. When joined with Verad, Dax is highly motivated to continue Verad's immoral plan despite a continued feeling of friendship with Sisko and others on DS9. Jadzia, on the other hand, comments on how lonely and unconfident she feels once separated from Dax.

Yedrin Dax
Yedrin Dax, portrayed by Gary Frank, is a host of the Dax symbiont in an alternate timeline that is created when the USS Defiant travels two hundred years backwards in time in the "Children of Time" DS9 season 5 episode 22. He is the great-grandson of Jadzia Dax and Worf. His existence is erased when the Defiant avoids the crash and that timeline is averted.

Others named Dax
 Dax, son of Kang is a Klingon named after his godfather, Curzon Dax (see above).
 Dax (played by Michael Snyder) is also the name of a crewman aboard the USS Enterprise (NCC-1701-A) in Star Trek VI: The Undiscovered Country.

References

External links

Star Trek alien characters
Star Trek: Deep Space Nine characters
Television characters introduced in 1993
Fictional androgynes